Bellingcat: Truth in a Post-Truth World is a 2018 documentary film that explores the investigative journalism work published of Bellingcat, including the Skripal poisoning and the crash of Malaysia Airlines Flight 17.

The film has been screened both in the International Documentary Filmfestival Amsterdam in 2018 and in the Human Rights Watch Film Festival in 2019.

The film won the RTBF award at the festival des Liberétes 2019. In November 2019, it won an International Emmy Award in the documentary category.

See also 

 We Are Bellingcat: Global Crime, Online Sleuths, and the Bold Future of News, 2021 book

References

Literature

External links 

 Official website
 
 Bellingcat: Truth in a Post-Truth World on Rotten Tomatoes

2018 documentary films
Documentary films about journalism
Dutch documentary films
Citizen journalism
2018 films